YZU may refer to:

 Whitecourt Airport (IATA: YZU) in Alberta, Canada
 Yangzhou University in Yangzhou, China
 Yuan Ze University in Taoyuan City, Taiwan